Gerald Spencer Mobey (5 March 1904 – 2 March 1979) was an English professional first-class cricketer. He was a right-handed batsman and wicketkeeper.

Mobey played for Surrey from 1930 to 1938 but he was essentially their reserve wicketkeeper as understudy to Ted Brooks. Mobey would have toured India with the England national cricket team in 1939–40 if Marylebone Cricket Club's scheduled tour had gone ahead. The team had been selected but the outbreak of the Second World War on 1 September 1939 caused the tour's immediate cancellation.

Mobey was born at Surbiton and died at Woking, both in Surrey. He made 81 first-class appearances according to CricketArchive, scoring 1,684 runs @ 18.10 with a highest innings of 75, one of six half-centuries. He held 127 catches and completed 11 stumpings.

References

Bibliography

External links 
 

1904 births
1979 deaths
English cricketers
English cricketers of 1919 to 1945
Surrey cricketers
Minor Counties cricketers
H. D. G. Leveson Gower's XI cricketers